Uh-Oh is a studio album by David Byrne, released in 1992. It was Byrne's second solo album after the confirmed dissolution of Talking Heads.

The album peaked at No. 125 on the Billboard 200. The single "She's Mad" reached No. 3 on the U.S. Modern Rock Tracks chart.

Production
The album was produced by Nick Launay. The cover portrays angels gathered around a cartoon dog (god spelled backward).

Critical reception
The New York Times wrote that "Byrne has finally figured out how to make the wacky Pan-American dance album he's been after since the mid-1980's." The Guardian deemed Uh-Oh "the most Talking-Heads-esque of Byrne’s solo albums, albeit with a Latin-American influence." The Washington Post thought that Byrne's "yelps, which range from intentionally comic to comically arty, rarely dominate their rhythmically dense, albeit melodically bland, settings." The Orlando Sentinel wrote that the "Afro-Brazilian influences are more fully integrated now than on 1989's Rei Momo."

The track A Million Miles Away was used as the theme song of the TV show Flying Blind.

Track listing
All tracks composed by David Byrne; except where indicated

Personnel
David Byrne – Vocals and guitar
Nona Hendryx – Background vocals
Dolette McDonald – Background vocals
Joyce Bowden - Background vocals
George Porter Jr. – Bass guitar
Angel Fernandez – Trumpet
Tom Zé – Percussion instruments
Arranged By – Angel Fernandez (tracks: 6, 11, 12), David Byrne (tracks: 6, 11, 12)
Arranged By [Horns, Woodwinds & Strings], Conductor [Horns, Woodwinds & Strings] – Angel Fernandez (tracks: 1, 2, 4 to 12)
Artwork [Drawings] – Mr. Chick, Scott Stowell
Backing Vocals – Billy Cliff (tracks: 3, 7, 12), Dolette McDonald (tracks: 1, 3, 7, 9, 10, 12), John James (5) (tracks: 3, 7, 12), Joyce L. Bowden (tracks: 1, 9, 10), Nicky Holland (tracks: 4, 8, 11), Nona Hendryx (tracks: 3, 7, 12)
Bata – Milton Cardona (tracks: 4)
Bongos, Percussion [Blocks], Bells [Bell], Agogô [Ago-go], Tamborim, Surdo [Surdu] – Café
Clarinet [Bass] – Ronnie Cuber (tracks: 1, 6, 11)
Congas, Maracas, Triangle, Percussion [Tambora] – Hector Rosado
Drums, Timbales, Cowbell, Percussion [Woodblock], Surdo [Surdu], Bells [Bell], Shaker [Shakere] – Oscar Salas
Flugelhorn – Angel Fernandez (tracks: 1, 11)
Flute, Clarinet – Steve Sacks (tracks: 1, 11)
French Horn – Fred Griffen (tracks: 1, 11), John Clark (2) (tracks: 1, 11)
Oboe – Melanie Feld (tracks: 1, 11)
Saxophone [Alto] – Dick Oatts (tracks: 3, 9, 12), Steve Sacks (tracks: 3, 5, 8)
Saxophone [Baritone] – Ronnie Cuber (tracks: 5, 8, 9, 12)
Saxophone [Tenor] – Ken Hitchcock (tracks: 9, 12), Lawrence Feldman (tracks: 5, 8)
Synthesizer, Clavinet, Vibraphone [Vibes] – Ashley Cadell
Trombone – Christopher Washburne (tracks: 5, 8, 9, 12), Gerald Chamberlain (tracks: 4, 12)
Trombone [Tenor] – Christopher Washburne (tracks: 3, 11)
Trumpet – Ite Jerez* (tracks: 4, 5, 8, 9, 12), Angel Fernandez (tracks: 4, 5, 8, 9, 12), Charlie Sepulveda (tracks: 3, 11),  Joe Shepley (tracks: 3, 4, 9, 12)
Vocals, Acoustic Guitar, Electric Guitar, Effects [Prepared Pens], Whistle – David Byrne
Written-By – Angel Fernandez (tracks: 1, 5, 11), David Byrne, Terry Allen (tracks: 3)
Engineer [Assistant At Electric Lady] – Michael White
Engineer [Assistant At Platinum Island] – Axel Niehaus
Engineer [Assistant At Power Station] – Dan Gellart
Engineer [Assistant At Sigma Sound] – Brian Kinkead, Michael Scalcione
Engineer [Assistant At The Hit Factory] – Michael Gilbert
Mastered By – Bob Ludwig
Producer, Recorded By, Mixed By – Nick Launay
Painting [Cover Painting] – Brian Dewan
Photography By [Band Photos] – David Byrne
Photography By [David Byrne Photo] – Chris Nofzinger

Release history

References

1992 albums
Albums produced by Nick Launay
David Byrne albums
Luaka Bop albums
Warner Records albums